Peabo is the debut album by soul vocalist  Peabo Bryson.  Luther Vandross and Cissy Houston were among the background vocalists on this album.

Reception

Released in 1976 on Bullet Records, this was Bryson's only album with the label before moving on to Capitol Records. Capitol subsequently took control of the rights to this album and the rest of his Bullet recordings released and unreleased.

Track listing
All songs written by Peabo Bryson, except where noted.
"Just Another Day" - 3:42   	
"Do You Believe in Love" - 2:54 (Bryson, Paul Davis)	
"It's Just a Matter of Time" - 3:31 	
"I Can Make It Better" - 5:08 	
"You Bring Out The Best in Me" - 3:57 	
"Smile" - 4:58 	
"Underground Music" - 3:31 	
"Lovely Lady" - 4:05 	
"Let The Music Play" - 3:21 	
"God is On Our Side" - 3:55

Personnel 
 Peabo Bryson – lead vocals
 Robin Clark, Hilda Harris, Cissy Houston, Troy Keyes, Ed Seay, Maeretha Stewart, Diane Sumler and Luther Vandross – backing vocals
 Gene Page – arrangements (1, 2, 3, 5, 7-10)
 Michael Zager – arrangements (4, 6)

Muscle Shoals Rhythm Section (Tracks 1, 2, 3 & 7)
 Barry Beckett – keyboards
 Jesse Carr – guitar
 Jimmy Johnson – guitar
 David Hood – bass
 Roger Hawkins – drums, percussion

L.A. Rhythm Section (Tracks 4, 5, 8 & 9)
 Sylvester Rivers – keyboards
 Rick Littlefield – guitar
 Ray Parker Jr. – guitar
 David T. Walker – guitar
 Henry Davis – bass
 Ed Greene – drums
 Gary Coleman – percussion
 Bobbye Hall – percussion

Bottom & Co. Rhythm Section (Track 6)
 Fred Birdwell – keyboards
 Jesse Boyce – synthesizers, bass
 John Helms – guitars
 Freeman Brown – drums
 Sanchez Harley – saxophone

Bang Rhythm Section (Track 10)
 Peabo Bryson – keyboards
 Ronn Price – keyboards, guitar, bass
 Thom Fowle – guitar
 Beaver Parker – drums, percussion

Production
 Producer – Peabo Bryson
 Executive Producer – Eddie Biscoe and Ilene Biscoe
 Engineers – Tom Roberts, Rick Rowe and Ed Seay.
 Mixed by Rick Rowe and Ed Seay at Sound Ideas Studios (New York, NY).
 Mastered at Masterfonics (Nashville, TN).
 Art Direction – Eddie Biscoe
 Design and Artwork – Mike McCarty
 Photography – David Alexander

Charts

Singles

External links
 Peabo Bryson-Peabo at Discogs

References

1976 debut albums
Peabo Bryson albums